Cobubatha ochrocraspis is a species of moth in the family Noctuidae (the owlet moths). It is found in North America.

The MONA or Hodges number for Cobubatha ochrocraspis is 9012.1.

References

Further reading

 
 

Eustrotiinae